Bat Hen (lit. Daughter of Grace) is a community settlement in central Israel. Located on the coast of the Mediterranean Sea, it falls under the jurisdiction of Hefer Valley Regional Council.

History
Founded in 1967, the village is named after a flower. For a while it split into two settlements, Bat Hen Alef and Bat Hen Bet, though they later merged back into one.

References

Community settlements
Populated places established in 1967
Populated places in Central District (Israel)
1967 establishments in Israel